Fallon County is a county located in the U.S. state of Montana. As of the 2020 census, the population was 3,049. Its county seat is Baker. The county was created in 1913 from a portion of Custer County. It is named for Benjamin O'Fallon, a nephew of Captain William Clark and an Indian agent for the upper Missouri region from 1823 to 1827.

Geography

Adjacent counties

 Wibaux County - north
 Prairie County - northwest
 Custer County - west
 Carter County - south
 Harding County, South Dakota - southeast
 Bowman County, North Dakota - east
 Slope County, North Dakota - east
 Golden Valley County, North Dakota - northeast

Politics

Demographics

2000 census
As of the 2000 United States census, there were 2,837 people, 1,140 households, and 803 families living in the county. The population density was 2 people per square mile (1/km2). There were 1,410 housing units at an average density of 1 per square mile (0/km2). The racial makeup of the county was 98.59% White, 0.14% Black or African American, 0.32% Native American, 0.35% Asian, 0.04% Pacific Islander, 0.11% from other races, and 0.46% from two or more races.  0.39% of the population were Hispanic or Latino of any race. 39.4% were of German, 16.9% Norwegian, 10.0% Irish and 8.2% English ancestry. 97.2% spoke English and 1.7% German as their first language.

There were 1,140 households, out of which 32.10% had children under the age of 18 living with them, 60.50% were married couples living together, 6.00% had a female householder with no husband present, and 29.50% were non-families. 26.60% of all households were made up of individuals, and 13.20% had someone living alone who was 65 years of age or older. The average household size was 2.45 and the average family size was 2.96.

The county population contained 25.50% under the age of 18, 6.20% from 18 to 24, 25.50% from 25 to 44, 24.80% from 45 to 64, and 17.90% who were 65 years of age or older. The median age was 41 years. For every 100 females there were 102.20 males. For every 100 females age 18 and over, there were 96.70 males.

The median income for a household in the county was $29,944, and the median income for a family was $38,636. Males had a median income of $27,045 versus $18,077 for females. The per capita income for the county was $16,014. About 9.50% of families and 12.50% of the population were below the poverty line, including 17.50% of those under age 18 and 6.60% of those age 65 or over.

2010 census
As of the 2010 United States census, there were 2,890 people, 1,233 households, and 810 families living in the county. The racial makeup of the county was 97.4% white, 0.6% Asian, 0.4% American Indian, 0.1% Pacific islander, 0.1% black or African American, 0.2% from other races, and 1.3% from two or more races. Those of Hispanic or Latino origin made up 1.2% of the population. In terms of ancestry, 53.0% were German, 24.8% were Irish, 12.1% were Norwegian, 10.6% were English, 5.3% were Scotch-Irish, and 0.4% were American.

Of the 1,233 households, 28.4% had children under the age of 18 living with them, 56.0% were married couples living together, 5.7% had a female householder with no husband present, 34.3% were non-families, and 30.1% of all households were made up of individuals. The average household size was 2.32 and the average family size was 2.88. The median age was 42.9 years.

The median income for a household in the county was $52,529 and the median income for a family was $64,500. Males had a median income of $41,570 versus $30,000 for females. The per capita income for the county was $26,819. About 5.7% of families and 8.5% of the population were below the poverty line, including 16.3% of those under age 18 and 3.4% of those age 65 or over.

Transportation

Major highways
  U.S. Highway 12
  Montana Highway 7

Airport
The Baker Municipal Airport is southeast of Baker.

Communities

Cities
 Baker (county seat)

Towns
 Plevna

Unincorporated communities

 Cabin Creek
 Ollie
 Webster
 Westmore
 Willard

See also
 List of lakes in Fallon County, Montana
 List of mountains in Fallon County, Montana
 National Register of Historic Places listings in Fallon County, Montana

References

External links
 Fallon County, Montana 

 
1913 establishments in Montana
Populated places established in 1913